The 1982 Melbourne Cup was a two-mile handicap horse race which took place on Tuesday, 2 November 1982.

The race is best remembered for the defeat of champion Kingston Town who had won his third Cox Plate the start before. Fellow Tommy Smith trained Just A Dash was sent out the 11/2 favourite. Gelding Gurner's Lane ran third in the Metropolitan Handicap and then won the Caulfield Cup and incurred a 3 kg penalty for the cup. Gurner's Lane won by a neck beating Kingston Town. Malcolm Johnston was heavily criticised for taking 'The King' to the lead too early. Kingston Town went to Perth and broke down after winning what would be his last race, now named the Kingston Town Classic; Gurner's Lane never won another race. He did also win the 1982 AJC and the VRC St Leger Stakes. This impressive run of race victories saw him awarded the Australian Horse of the Year for the 1982–1983 season.

Field 

This is a list of horses which ran in the 1982 Melbourne Cup.

References

1982
Melbourne Cup
Melbourne Cup
1980s in Melbourne